Unieść is a river in West Pomeranian Voivodeship of Poland. It is located west of Sianów in the historic Farther Pomerania region on the Baltic coast. The river empties into the Jamno lake.

See also
Unieście

Rivers of Poland
Rivers of West Pomeranian Voivodeship